This article details the squads of all the participant nations of the 2022 African Nations Championship which was held in Algeria. A flag is included for coaches who are of a different nationality than their own national team. Players in cursive were registered as reserves.

Group A

Algeria
Manager: Madjid Bougherra

The squad was announced on 2 January 2023 with 28 players.

Libya
Manager:  Corentin Martins

Ethiopia
Manager: Wubetu Abate

Mozambique
Manager: Chiquinho Conde

Group B

DR Congo
Manager:  Otis Ngoma

Ivory Coast
Manager: Souhalio Haïdara

Senegal
Manager: Pape Thiaw

Uganda
Manager:  Milutin Sredojević

Group C

Morocco
Morocco was originally set to take part in the tournament with their under-23 national team after their football federation disbanded their official CHAN team on 31 August 2022. However, they announced their withdrawal a day before the tournament began.

Sudan
Manager: Burhan Tia

Madagascar
Manager: Romuald Rakotondrabe

Ghana
Manager: Annor Walker

The squad was announced on Christmas Day (25 December) 2022.

Group D

Mali
Manager: Nouhoum Diane

Angola
Manager:  Pedro Gonçalves

Mauritania
Manager:  Amir Abdou

Group E

Cameroon
Manager: Alioum Saidou

Congo
Manager: Jean Élie Ngoya Obackas

The squad was announced on 2 January 2023.

Niger
Manager: Harouna Doula Gabde

References

2022 African Nations Championship
African Nations Championship squads